Thomas William Hiddleston (born 9 February 1981) is an English actor. He gained international fame portraying Loki in the Marvel Cinematic Universe (MCU), starting with Thor in 2011 and most recently in the Disney+ series Loki in 2021.

He started his film career in the Joanna Hogg films Unrelated (2007) and Archipelago (2010). In 2011, Hiddleston portrayed F. Scott Fitzgerald in Woody Allen's romantic comedy Midnight in Paris, and appeared in Steven Spielberg's War Horse. ​That year, he won the Empire Award for Best Male Newcomer and was nominated for the BAFTA Rising Star Award. He continued working with auteurs in independent films including Terence Davies' The Deep Blue Sea (2012), Jim Jarmusch's romantic vampire film Only Lovers Left Alive (2013) and Guillermo del Toro's Crimson Peak (2015). He also starred in Ben Wheatley's action film High Rise, and played the troubled country music singer Hank Williams in the biopic I Saw The Light. The film Kong: Skull Island (2017) marked his first big-budget leading role outside the MCU.

Hiddleston made his stage debut in Journey's End in 1999. He continued acting in theatre including the West End productions of Cymbeline (2007) and Ivanov (2008). He won the Olivier Award for Best Newcomer in a Play for his role in Cymbeline and was also nominated for the same award for his role as Cassio in Othello (2008). Hiddleston starred as the title character in a production of Coriolanus (2013–14), winning the Evening Standard Theatre Award for Best Actor and receiving a nomination for the Olivier Award for Best Actor. He made his Broadway debut in a 2019 revival of Harold Pinter's classic drama Betrayal, for which he was nominated for the Tony Award for Best Actor in a Play.

Hiddleston's also known for his performances in television including his part in the 2012 BBC series The Hollow Crown's Henry IV and Henry V. Hiddleston starred in and executive-produced the AMC / BBC limited series The Night Manager (2016), for which he received two Primetime Emmy Award nominations, and won his first Golden Globe Award for Best Actor – Miniseries or Television Film.

Early life
Thomas William Hiddleston was born on 9 February 1981 in the Westminster district of London, to Diana Patricia (née Servaes) Hiddleston, an arts administrator and former stage manager, and Dr. James Norman Hiddleston, a physical chemist and former managing director of a biotechnology company that liaised with Oxford University. His father is from Greenock, Scotland and his mother is from Suffolk. His younger sister, Emma, is also an actress, whilst his older sister, Sarah, is a journalist in India. Through his mother, he is a great-grandson of Vice Admiral Reginald Servaes and a great-great-grandson of food producer Sir Edmund Vestey. His paternal grandfather, Alexander, served in the Royal Artillery and worked as a plater in the shipyards. He shares the same name as his great-great uncle, Tom Hiddleston, a shipyard plater from Greenock and a member of Royal Artillery's 51st (Highland) Division, who died after the Battle of the Somme and whose name is engraved in the Broomhill war memorial.

Hiddleston was raised in Wimbledon in his early years, and later moved to a village near Oxford. He began boarding at Windlesham House School at age seven, moving to the Dragon School in Oxford a year later. His parents divorced when he was twelve. Regarding his parents' divorce, he said, "I like to think it made me more compassionate in my understanding of human frailty."

At age thirteen, Hiddleston started at Eton College, again as a boarder. He continued on to Pembroke College at the University of Cambridge, where he earned a double first in Classics. During his second term at Cambridge, he was seen in a production of A Streetcar Named Desire by talent agent Lorraine Hamilton of Hamilton Hodell. He proceeded to study acting at the Royal Academy of Dramatic Art, from which he graduated in 2005.

Career

Early work (2001–2010) 

While still doing student plays, Hiddleston began appearing on television, landing parts in Stephen Whittaker's adaptation of Nicholas Nickleby (2001) for ITV, the BBC/HBO co-production Conspiracy (2001), and as Randolph Churchill, the son of Winston Churchill, in the BBC/HBO drama The Gathering Storm (2002).

Upon graduating from RADA, Hiddleston was cast in his first film role, playing Oakley in Joanna Hogg's first feature film, Unrelated (2006). His sister Emma also appeared in the film as Badge. Casting director, Lucy Bevan, who cast him in the film said "there was just a fantastic confidence about him". Hiddleston had leading roles in Declan Donnellan's company Cheek by Jowl's productions The Changeling (2006), and Cymbeline (2007). For the latter he won the Laurence Olivier Award for Best Newcomer in a Play. His Donmar Warehouse credits include Cassio in Michael Grandage's production of Shakespeare's Othello (2008) alongside Chiwetel Ejiofor and Ewan McGregor, and Lvov in the West End revival of Chekhov's Ivanov (2008) with Kenneth Branagh.

Hiddleston was the voiceover for BBC's documentary on the Galapagos Island in 2006. He also narrated the audiobook The Red Necklace by Sally Gardner in 2007, Hiddleston played the leading role of Edward in Hogg's second feature, Archipelago (2010). His TV credits include Magnus Martinsson in the BBC detective drama Wallander (2008), Bill Hazledine in Suburban Shootout (2006), John Plumptre in the BBC costume drama TV film Miss Austen Regrets (2008) and William Buxton in the BBC drama series Return to Cranford (2009). In 2007, he joined a list of British actors, including Kate Winslet and Orlando Bloom, to have guest starred in the long-running medical drama Casualty.

Breakthrough and worldwide recognition (2011–2014) 

Hiddleston is well-known for his portrayal of Loki in the 2011 Marvel Studios film Thor. He was invited to audition by Kenneth Branagh, the film's director, after having previously worked with Branagh on Ivanov and Wallander. Hiddleston said of Branagh, "Ken has had a life-changing effect. He was able to say to the executives, 'Trust me on this, you can cast Tom and he will deliver'. It was massive and it's completely changed the course of what is available to me to do. Ken gave me my break." He originally auditioned for the role of Thor, recalling, "That was what I was being considered for, because I'm tall and blonde and classically trained, and that seemed to be the mold for what Thor was, he was to be a classical character. And it was in my auditions. I owe this entirely to Marvel and their open-mindedness, they saw something that they thought was interesting. They saw some temperament that they liked." Hiddleston was given six weeks to bulk up, so he went on a strict diet and gained twenty pounds of muscle. Branagh ultimately decided he was more suitable as the antagonist and cast him as Loki. Empire magazine ranked Hiddleston's portrayal of Loki as the 19th Greatest Movie Character of All Time.

In November 2010, Hiddleston appeared with Benedict Cumberbatch, Gemma Arterton, Eddie Redmayne and Rose Byrne among others in Danny Boyle's one time production of The Children's Monologues, in which he played Prudence, a young girl upset with her mother for her father leaving and excited for her birthday. The play was a one time event of adapted stories of children's first-hand experiences in South Africa being re-interpreted by and performed by various actors.

In 2011, Hiddleston portrayed novelist F. Scott Fitzgerald in writer-director Woody Allen's Midnight in Paris. He then played the noble Captain Nicholls in War Horse, a film based on the 1982 novel by Michael Morpurgo, directed by Steven Spielberg. The same year he starred as Freddie Page, a RAF pilot in the drama The Deep Blue Sea, alongside Rachel Weisz. In 2012, he reprised his role as the supervillain Loki in The Avengers. While filming a scene with Chris Hemsworth, who plays Thor, the film's director, Joss Whedon told the fighting duo that the scene did not look real enough, so Hiddleston told Hemsworth to really hit him for the fight scene. "I said to Chris, 'Dude, just hit me. Just hit me because I'm protected here and it's fine.' He's like, 'Are you sure?' I was like, 'Yeah, it will look great. Just go for it.'" He provided the voiceover the Ancient Egyptian Book of the Dead in 2011 and poetry for iF Poems and The Love Book on iTunes in 2012.

On television in 2012, Hiddleston appeared in the BBC Two series The Hollow Crown, portraying Prince Hal opposite Jeremy Irons as Henry IV in the adaptation of Shakespeare's Henry IV, Part I and Part II. He later appeared as King Henry V in the television film Henry V. In 2013, Hiddleston played Loki again in Thor: The Dark World, following which he played a vampire in Jim Jarmusch's film Only Lovers Left Alive with Tilda Swinton and Mia Wasikowska.

From December 2013 to February 2014, Hiddleston played the title character in William Shakespeare's Coriolanus at the Donmar Warehouse in Covent Garden directed by Josie Rourke. It was also aired live internationally on 30 January 2014. David Benedict of Variety praised a "scorching" performance. He had a cameo in the 2014 film Muppets Most Wanted, as the Great Escapo.

Varied roles and further success (2015–present) 
Hiddleston replaced Benedict Cumberbatch in the gothic horror film Crimson Peak, directed by Guillermo del Toro. The film started filming in Toronto in February 2014, and was released in October 2015. He starred as Robert Laing in High-Rise (2015), based on J. G. Ballard's novel of the same name and directed by Ben Wheatley.

In January 2014, Hiddleston became a spokesperson for Jaguar Cars in their "Good to be Bad" ad campaign featuring British actors in villain-themed commercials to promote Jaguar's new models. The first commercial of the campaign, titled "Rendezvous", first aired during the 2014 Super Bowl and featured Hiddleston along with Mark Strong and Ben Kingsley. Hiddleston starred in another commercial in the campaign, titled "The Art of Villainy" in April of the same year. It was released on YouTube, promoting the F-Type coupe.

It was announced in June 2014 that Hiddleston would portray country music singer Hank Williams in the 2015 biopic I Saw the Light, based on the 1994 biography. The film was directed by Marc Abraham, and was first shown in the Special Presentations section of the 2015 Toronto International Film Festival. The film was released on 25 March 2016, by Sony Pictures Classics. While the film wasn't well-received, Hiddleston's performance was widely praised by critics. Stephanie Zacharek of Time magazine called him "magnificent" adding that "he honors Williams' greatness but also wriggles beyond it."

Hiddleston was one of the narrators in the 2015 documentary Unity directed by Shaun Monson. He appeared as Jonathan Pine in the 2016 television mini-series The Night Manager based on the espionage and detective novel of the same name by John le Carré. The series started filming in Spring 2015 and aired on BBC and AMC with Hugh Laurie also starring. Ben Travers of IndieWire noted that he carried the role of Pine from start to finish, "with an admirable determination and aptly unbreakable constitution." For his performance in the series he was nominated for several awards, including two Primetime Emmy Awards and won a Golden Globe Award for Best Actor.

In early 2017, Hiddleston expressed his will to take a long break from work, and his desire to work again in theatre. Later the same year, he starred in Legendary Pictures' King Kong film, Kong: Skull Island. Released on 10 March, and directed by Jordan Vogt-Roberts, the film was a commercial success, earning over $566 million worldwide and received generally positive reviews. In September 2017, he played the title character in a limited run of William Shakespeare's Hamlet directed by Kenneth Branagh. The production ran for three weeks at a 160-seat theater, with the tickets given out by lottery system to raise money for RADA. Michael Billington of The Guardian called his performance "a compelling Hamlet with a genuine nobility of soul." Ann Treneman of The Times praised his performance writing that he made the role "completely his own, emotional, magnetic, canny, often frolicsome" and that is "a shame is that so few will see his HiddleHamlet."

He reprised the role of Loki in Thor: Ragnarok, released on 3 November 2017, and also appeared in Avengers: Infinity War (2018) and Avengers: Endgame (2019). All three films were well-received with Endgame grossing over $2 billion worldwide to rank as the highest-grossing film of all time. He voiced the villain in Nick Park's animated film Early Man which was released in early 2018. Later that year he appeared in the short film Leading Lady Parts in support of the Time's Up initiative alongside Emilia Clarke, Felicity Jones and Florence Pugh. In 2019, he starred as Robert from 5 March to 8 June in a revival of Harold Pinter's Betrayal at the Harold Pinter Theatre, directed by Jamie Lloyd. The play premiered to positive reviews and succeeded to have a sold-out West End run, with Henry Hitchings of the Evening Standard finding him to be "irresistibly magnetic" with an impressive "poise and sensitivity" in his part. In August 2019, he made his Broadway debut reprising the role of Robert in Betrayal, as the production transferred to Broadway for a 17-week limited engagement at the Bernard B. Jacobs Theatre. Reviewing the Broadway staging in Variety, Marilyn Stasio called Hiddleston's performance "a striking physical, as well as an emotionally complicated one." He received a Tony Award for Best Actor in a Play nomination for it.

Hiddleston narrated Earth At Night In Color, an American nature documentary television series created by Offspring Films. The series premiered on 4 December 2020 on Apple TV+, with a second season premiering on 16 April 2021. Initially announced in November 2018, Hiddleston reprised his role as Loki in Loki which premiered on Disney+ in June 2021. The primarily Norwegian-language song Very Full he sings in the third episode of Loki debuted at number ten on the Billboard World Digital Song Sales. Loki received generally favorable reviews, and on 14 July 2021 was officially renewed for a second season. Michael Idato, reviewing for The Sydney Morning Herald concluded that "Hiddleston’s performance as Loki has always been defined by its humour as much as its pathos. Both seem to be on display in equal measure in Loki." TVLine named him "Performer of the Week" after first season ended, stating that "Hiddleston had to bring back a greedier, more insolent version of the God of Mischief, while also softening him enough. It was a delicate balance for the actor, and one he struck beautifully."

In March 2021, it was announced that Hiddleston had joined the cast of the Apple TV+ drama series The Essex Serpent, based on the novel of the same name, by Sarah Perry. He played the role of Reverend Will Ransome opposite Cora Seaborne, played by Claire Danes. The series premiered on May 13, 2022. In August 2021, he voiced Loki in the animated series What If...?. 

Hiddleston has also made voice appearances in The Simpsons short films on Disney+ as Loki. The short film The Good, the Bart, and the Loki was released in July 2021 and Welcome to the Club in September 2022.

Upcoming projects
In February 2020, it was announced that he is set to star in Netflix political thriller series White Stork. Hiddleston is in talks to reprise his role in a second series of The Night Manager. He is attached to star in a Ben Wheatley's adaptation of Frank Miller's comic book mini-series Hard Boiled produced by Warner Bros and in a James Ivory's adaptation of Shakespeare's Richard II as the eponymous character.

In April 2022 it was announced that he will be starring in and executive producing the Apple TV+ limited series The White Darkness.

Media image and acting style
One of the most high-profile actors in contemporary British popular culture, Hiddleston appeared on Debrett's 2017 list of the most influential people in the United Kingdom. In 2015, he was named the British Film Institute's first official founding ambassador. In 2016, Hiddleston was awarded the male Rear of the Year title, a light-hearted accolade that recognises British celebrities who are found to have a notable posterior. He has been named most stylish/best dressed man in several listings. Taffy Brodesser-Akner of GQ describes his off-screen persona as "a sweet-natured bookworm given the face and body of the only man who should ever be allowed to wear a suit". His Crimson Peak director Guillermo del Toro and the comic book writer Stan Lee have called him "the nicest guy on earth/you'll ever meet" with del Toro adding that he breaks the usual barrier of being either nice or good-looking.

Kenneth Branagh noted that the first time he ever saw Hiddleston, playing Cassio in Othello, it was quite clear to him that he was an utterly naturalistic speaker of Shakespeare. Michael Billington of The Guardian wrote that Hiddleston's key acting quality is "his ability to combine a sweet sadness with an incandescent fury, suggesting a fierce intellect gnawed by intense melancholy and yet subjecting to bouts of intemperate rage." Charles McNulty of the Los Angeles Times describes Hiddleston as "an actor of uncommon intelligence and Pre-Raphaelite beauty." Hiddleston spent nearly five weeks preparing for the role of Hank Williams, performing seven of the film's soundtrack songs. He claims that method acting is not easy for him because it does not help him as a collaborator. The Daily Telegraphs Dominic Cavendish suggested that Hiddleston "has got the theatrical acting chops to head up there among the greats", while The Independents Paul Taylor remarked that "his range is beginning to look pretty limitless". David Fear of Rolling Stone opined that there are two sides to Hiddleston, the old-school movie star of Midnight in Paris, War Horse or The Night Manager, and the "unpredictable, borderline weirdo version" of him seen in characters like Loki or in High-Rise, adding that Hiddleston refuses to settle on one specific kind of role.

Personal life
Hiddleston resides in the Belsize Park area of north-west London as of 2016.

Hiddleston dated English actress Susannah Fielding from 2008 to 2011 after they met while filming an episode of Wallander which Hiddleston was a series regular on. In 2016, Hiddleston briefly dated American singer-songwriter Taylor Swift.

In March 2022, it was announced that Hiddleston was engaged to English actress and writer Zawe Ashton, whom he starred with in the 2019 West End and Broadway play Betrayal. In June 2022, it was announced that they were expecting their first child.

Charity work
He has donated items for auction and has supported several charities, including the Small Steps Project, Starlight Children's Foundation, Cure EB, Comic Relief, Red Nose Day USA, Thomas Coram Foundation for Children, Great Ormond Street Hospital, Amnesty International and Chance to Shine.

He is a UK ambassador of the humanitarian and developmental assistance fund group UNICEF. He travelled to Guinea in early 2013 to raise awareness about hunger and malnutrition, and to South Sudan in early 2015 and late 2016 to report the results of the ongoing civil war on the lives of vast numbers of children across the country. Hiddleston identifies as a feminist. In February 2018, he was named one of the donators by Justice and Equality Fund, the UK version of the Time's Up initiative. He is also an ambassador of the Illuminating BAFTA campaign, an action which aims to provide opportunities to those who otherwise would not have been given a chance in the film, games and television industries.

Acting credits and awards

According to Rotten Tomatoes and Box Office Mojo, Hiddleston's most critically acclaimed and commercially successful films are Unrelated (2007), Archipelago (2010), Thor (2011), Midnight in Paris (2011), The Avengers (2012), Only Lovers Left Alive (2013), Kong: Skull Island (2017), Thor: Ragnarok (2017), Avengers: Infinity War (2018), and Avengers: Endgame (2019).

Hiddleston has received a Golden Globe Award and a Laurence Olivier Award among other accolades.

References

External links

 

1981 births
Living people
People educated at The Dragon School
People educated at Eton College
Alumni of Pembroke College, Cambridge
Alumni of RADA
English male film actors
English male radio actors
English male stage actors
English male television actors
English male video game actors
English male voice actors
Male actors from London
English people of Scottish descent
Laurence Olivier Award winners
English male Shakespearean actors
21st-century English male actors
English feminists
Male feminists
Best Miniseries or Television Movie Actor Golden Globe winners
People educated at Windlesham House School
People from Westminster